Paulo Javier Taborga (born 15 April 1979) is a Bolivian former professional tennis player.

A left-handed player from La Paz, Taborga was a doubles silver medalist at the 1997 Bolivarian Games, debuting for Bolivia's Davis Cup team the following year. He earned the top national ranking in Bolivia during his career.

Taborga played collegiate tennis in the United States for the University of Notre Dame, where as a senior in 2002 he received All-American honors and was an NCAA singles championship participant. That year he also achieved the distinction of registering wins over both the top ranked singles player and doubles duo in college tennis.

Following college he turned professional and had a best singles world ranking of 519, with four ITF Futures titles as a doubles player. He made his last Davis Cup appearance in 2004, having featured in a total of 23 ties, for 21 overall wins. Later he had a younger brother Carlos represent Bolivia in the Davis Cup.

ITF Futures finals

Singles: 2 (0–2)

Doubles: 5 (4–1)

References

External links
 
 
 

1979 births
Living people
Bolivian male tennis players
Notre Dame Fighting Irish men's tennis players
Sportspeople from La Paz